Synorthodes is a genus of moths of the family Noctuidae.

Species
 Synorthodes auriginea Franclemont, 1976
 Synorthodes melanops (Dyar, 1912)
 Synorthodes typhedana Franclemont, 1976

References
Natural History Museum Lepidoptera genus database
Synorthodes at funet

Hadeninae